William C. Van Arsdel House, also known as The Elms, is a historic home located at Greencastle, Putnam County, Indiana. It was built in 1907, and is a -story, Colonial Revival style frame dwelling.  A rear addition was constructed in 1928.  It has a gambrel roof with three dormers.  The house features a balconied entrance portico with Corinthian order columns and corner pilasters.

It was listed on the National Register of Historic Places in 1984.  It is located in the Eastern Enlargement Historic District.

References

Houses on the National Register of Historic Places in Indiana
Colonial Revival architecture in Indiana
Houses completed in 1907
Buildings and structures in Putnam County, Indiana
National Register of Historic Places in Putnam County, Indiana
Historic district contributing properties in Indiana